Kristian Jaani (born 11 December 1976) is an Estonian politician and a former high-ranking police officer. He served as Minister of the Interior in the cabinet of Prime Minister Kaja Kallas from 2021 to 2022. He was nominated by the Centre Party as an independent in January 2021 and officially joined the party on 9 June 2021 and left the party 22 June 2022.

He graduated with degrees in police and internal security at the Estonian Academy of Security Sciences.

References 

Living people
1976 births
Politicians from Tallinn
Government ministers of Estonia
21st-century Estonian politicians
Ministers of the Interior of Estonia
Estonian police officers